Bajoga Northeast Airport  is an airport serving Bajoga and the Ashaka Cement Plant in Nigeria.

Runway length does not include a  displaced threshold on Runway 23.

See also
Transport in Nigeria
List of airports in Nigeria

References

External links
 OurAirports - Bajoga
 FallingRain - Bajoga
 OpenStreetMap - Bajoga

Airports in Nigeria